That Time I Got Reincarnated as a Slime is a 2018 television anime series based on the light novel series written by Fuse. The series follows a man who dies  and is reincarnated in another world as a slime named Rimuru. The series is animated by Eight Bit and directed by Yasuhito Kikuchi, with Atsushi Nakayama as assistant director, Kazuyuki Fudeyasu handling series composition, Ryouma Ebata designing the characters, and Takahiro Kishida providing monster designs. Elements Garden is composing the series' music. The series aired from October 2, 2018 to March 19, 2019 on Tokyo MX and other channels. The series is Simulcast by Crunchyroll with Funimation streaming an English dub as it airs. The series ran for 24 episodes. An original animation DVD was originally scheduled to be released on March 29, 2019, bundled with the 11th manga volume, but it was delayed to December 4, 2019, bundled with the 13th manga volume. A second original animation DVD released on July 9, 2019, bundled with the 12th manga volume.  Three more original animation DVDs have been announced, with the third OAD being released on March 27, 2020, bundled with the 14th manga volume.  The fourth OAD was bundled with the 15th manga volume, which released on July 9, 2020. The fifth OADs was bundled with 16th manga volume, which released on November 11, 2020.

A second season was announced to be a split-cour anime, and the first half was scheduled to premiere in October 2020, but has been delayed to January 2021 due to COVID-19.  The second half was also delayed from April to July 2021. The first half aired from January 12 to March 30, 2021, and the second half aired from July 6 to September 21, 2021.   Eight Bit returned to animate the series, with the staff and cast members reprising their roles.

A spin-off anime series based on the Slime Diaries: That Time I Got Reincarnated as a Slime manga was scheduled to premiere in January 2021 but was delayed to April 2021 due to COVID-19. The series aired from April 6 to June 22, 2021. Eight Bit also animated the series, with Yuji Ikuhara directing the series, Kotatsumikan writing the scripts, Risa Takai and Atsushi Irie as character designers, and R.O.N composing the music.

A third season was announced on November 9, 2022.

Series overview

Episode list

That Time I Got Reincarnated as a Slime

Season 1 (2018–19)

Season 2 (2021)

The Slime Diaries
A more light hearted series showing the day to day lives of those in Tempest; taking place in the gaps between major events.

See also
List of That Time I Got Reincarnated as a Slime volumes - the light novels and manga volumes list
List of That Time I Got Reincarnated as a Slime characters - the characters list

Notes

References

That Time I Got Reincarnated as a Slime